Juul Ellerman  (born 7 October 1965) is a Dutch former footballer, who played as a winger or as a central forward.

Club career
Ellerman started his professional career at Sparta and moved to PSV in 1988. He scored twice in a famous 1989 5-1 Champions' Cup win over previous year's finalists Steaua Bucharest with Romário scoring a hattrick and he scored the first ever hat-trick in the UEFA Champions League on 16 September 1992 for PSV Eindhoven against Žalgiris Vilnius in a 6–0 win. In 1994, Ellerman was deemed surplus to requirements and left PSV for FC Twente to replace Boudewijn Pahlplatz who moved the opposite way. He suffered from a serious knee injury and joined NEC in 1997 after Twente manager Hans Meyer said he did not need Ellerman's services anymore.

He retired in 2002 while playing for Helmond Sport.

International career
He was capped for the national under-21 team and made his senior debut for the Netherlands national team in a January 1989 friendly match against Israel. He earned a total of 5 caps, scoring no goals. His final international was a September 1991 friendly against Poland.

Honours
PSV
 Eredivisie (3): 1988–89, 1990–91, 1991–92
 KNVB Cup (2): 1988–89, 1989–90
 Dutch Supercup (1): 1992

References

External links
 

1965 births
Living people
Footballers from Dordrecht
Association football forwards
Dutch footballers
Netherlands youth international footballers
Netherlands international footballers
Eredivisie players
Eerste Divisie players
EBOH players
Sparta Rotterdam players
PSV Eindhoven players
FC Twente players
NEC Nijmegen players
Helmond Sport players